Mihai Tudose (born 6 March 1967, in Brăila, Brăila County, Socialist Republic of Romania) is a Romanian politician, deputy in the Parliament of Romania, a former Minister of Economy in 2017 and a former Prime Minister of Romania in 2018. On 16 January, 2018 he resigned from his position as Prime Minister after his own Social Democratic Party (PSD) retracted its political support for his government. He subsequently switched from PSD to Victor Ponta's party PRO Romania in 2019.

On 6 January, 2020 he resigned from PRO Romania and re-joined the Social Democratic Party (PSD)

Political career 
Mihai Tudose joined politics in 1992, as a member of the Democratic National Salvation Front (FDSN). Today, Tudose is member of the Social Democratic Party (PSD) and its national vice president since 2015. He entered the Parliament in 2000 and was elected consecutively for five terms as deputy in Brăila County. Mihai Tudose was Minister of Economy twice, between 2014 and 2015 in Fourth Ponta Cabinet and between February and June 2017 in Grindeanu Cabinet.

He was one of the potential candidates for Prime Minister brought forward by the majority coalition led by the Social Democratic Party (PSD) to succeed Sorin Grindeanu after the latter was dismissed by a motion of no confidence adopted in Parliament by his own party. On 26 June 2017, the majority coalition nominated him for the position and President Iohannis designated him. He took office with his cabinet on 29 June.

Controversy
As a holder of a doctorate in Military Sciences and Information, Tudose was involved in a plagiarism scandal after media reports had alleged that he might have plagiarized some parts of his doctoral work. In the aftermath of the scandal, he relinquished the use of his scientific title.

Commenting on the Székely autonomy initiatives and the use of their flag in public offices on 11 January 2018, Tudose said "If they fly Székely flags on institutions in Székely Land, the people who put the flags out will also hang next to the flags. Autonomy for Székelys is excluded." Acting president of the Democratic Alliance of Hungarians in Romania (UDMR) Bálint Porcsalmi said that Tudose's statement was inadmissible, calling it "primitive" and "reminiscent of the Middle Ages". Seven days later, Tudose was forced to resign from his position, partly due to the comments and infighting and lack of confidence via his party.

See also 
 Tudose Cabinet

References

|-

|-

1967 births
21st-century Romanian politicians
Living people
Members of the Chamber of Deputies (Romania)
Politicians from Brăila
People involved in plagiarism controversies
Prime Ministers of Romania
Romanian Ministers of Economy
Social Democratic Party (Romania) politicians
MEPs for Romania 2019–2024